Baghshan (also Romanized as Bāgh-shan; or , Romanized as Bagh-shan) is a village in Zeberkhan Rural District, Zeberkhan District, Nishapur County, Razavi Khorasan Province, Iran. At the 2006 census, its population was 2,769, in 797 families. Baghshan is located in the region of Razavi Khorasan. Razavi Khorasan's capital Mashhad . The distance from Baghshan to Iran's capital Tehrān is approximately 695 km / 432 miles (as the crow flies).

See also 

 List of cities, towns and villages in Razavi Khorasan Province

References 

Populated places in Nishapur County